Kesatuan Melayu United Kingdom ("KMUK" or the Malay Union of United Kingdom) was formed in 1920 by Malay students studying in the United Kingdom.  Its main aim was to nurture nationalism amongst the younger Malay intellectuals.

Several key initiators of the KMUK ended up as major figures in the struggle for independence against the British colonial power.  The first president of KMUK, Tuanku Abdul Rahman ibni Almarhum Tuanku Muhammad, became Malaya's first King or Yang di-Pertuan Agong.  His secretary (and eventual successor), Tunku Abdul Rahman Putra, became first Prime Minister of Malaya and later of Malaysia.

Politics of Malaysia